Somandargudi is a village in Kallakurichi district in the state of Tamil Nadu, India. It is located on the north bank of the river Gomuki, It is 6 km away from Kallakurichi, in Sankarapuram Taluk.

As per 2001 India census, Somandargudi had a population of 2,742. Males constitute 50% of the population and females 50%. Most of the villagers are farmers.

There is an elementary school, built by the villagers and since 1969 there has also been a Government high school.

Religion
There are many Hindu temples in Somandargudi. These include the ancient and popular Somanatheswara Temple. This temple was built by Parantaka Chola at the end of the 10th century.

Politics
S. P. Pachaiappan was one of the MLAs in 1967-1971 and S. Kaletheerthan was MLA (1980-1984 & 1984–1989).

References

Cities and towns in Kallakurichi district